The following is a timeline of the history of the city of Poznań, Poland.

Prior to 19th century

 968 – Roman Catholic Diocese of Poznań established.
 10th century – Poznań Cathedral built.
 1038
 City taken by forces of Bretislaus I, Duke of Bohemia.
 11th C. – St. Michael church built.
 1249 – Castle construction begins (approximate date).
 1253
 Town gains Magdeburg rights.
 Town Hall built.
 1296
 Wielkopolska Chronicle written.
 1320 – Town becomes capital of the Poznań Voivodeship.
 1341 – 29 September: Coronation of Adelaide of Hesse in Poznań Cathedral.
 1493 – Grand Master of the Teutonic Order Johann von Tiefen paid homage to King of Poland John I Albert.
 1518 – Lubrański Academy established.
 1534 – Waga Miejska (weighing house) built.
 1536 – Fire.
 1551 – Flood.
 1560 – Town Hall rebuilt on Market Square.
 1563 – Cloth Hall rebuilt.
 1573 – Jesuit College established.
 1611 – Origins of University in Poznań
 1655
 Monastery of Oratory of Saint Philip Neri established.
 City taken by Swedish forces.
 1677 – Jesuit printing press in operation.
 1701 – Baroque Poznań Fara completed.
 1704 – 9 August: Battle of Poznań during the Swedish invasion of Poland (1701–1706).
 1710 – Plague.
 1736 – Flood.
 1776 – Baroque Działyński Palace completed.
 1777 – New Baroque Monastery of Oratory of Saint Philip Neri completed.
 1787 – Odwach (guardhouse) on Market Square rebuilt.
 1793
 City annexed by Prussia in the Second Partition of Poland and included within the newly formed province of South Prussia
 City renamed "Posen."
 1796 – Population: 16,124.
 1800 – Śródka included within city limits.

19th century

 1803 – Fire.
 1806 – Napoleon temporarily headquartered in city.
 1807 – Town becomes part of the Duchy of Warsaw.
 1815 – Town becomes part of Prussia again.
 1828 – Poznań Fortress construction begins.
 1829 – Raczyński Library founded.
 1839 – Fort Winiary built.
 1841 – Scientific Help Society for the Youth of the Grand Duchy of Poznań  established.
 1842 – Bazar Hotel founded.
 1846
 Cegielski manufactory in business.
 February: "Insurrection."
 1848
 Greater Poland uprising.
 20 March: Polish National Committee founded.
 Szczecin–Poznań railway begins operating.
 1857
 Society of Friends of Learning established.
 Museum of Polish and Slavic Antiquities (present-day National Museum) founded.
 Israelitische Brüdergemeinde synagogue built.
 1859 – First Adam Mickiewicz monument in partitioned Poland unveiled.
 1871 – Grand Duchy of Poznań abolished.
 1872 – Kurjer Poznański newspaper begins publication.

 1875 – Polish Theatre and Stare Zoo established.
 1877 – Daughters of Charity of Saint Vincent de Paul expelled from Śródka.
 1879 – Poznań Central Station opens.
 1885
 Historical Society of Posen Province founded.
 Population: 68,315.
 1886 – Prussian Settlement Commission established to coordinate German colonization in the Prussian Partition of Poland.
 1891 – Richard Witting becomes mayor.
 1893 – Daughters of Charity of Saint Vincent de Paul came back to Śródka.
 1895
 Drukarnia i Księgarnia św. Wojciecha publisher in business.
 Population: 73,239.
 1896 – Piotrowo and Berdychowo become part of city.
 1898 – Electric tramway begins operating.
 1900 –  Górczyn, Jeżyce, Łazarz, and Wilda become part of city.

20th century

1900–1939
 1902 – Kaiser Wilhelm Library and Kaiser Friedrich Museum open.
 1903 – Royal Academy opens.
 1905 – Population: 136,808.
 1907 – Sołacz becomes part of city.
 1910
 Grand Theatre opens.
 Imperial Castle built.
 Higher State School of Machinery founded.  
 1912 – Warta Poznań football club formed.

 1918
 3 December: The first session of the Polish Provincial Sejm (parliament) of the former Prussian Partition of Poland in Poznań.
 27 December: Greater Poland Uprising (1918–19) against German rule begins.
 1919 – Poznań University, Poznań Observatory and Wielkopolskie Muzeum Wojska (military museum) founded.
 1921 – Poznań Fair begins.
 1922 – Lutnia Dębiec football club formed.
 1923 – Kronika Miasta Poznania (journal of city history) begins publication.
 1925 – Dębiec, Główna, Komandoria, Rataje, Starołęka, Szeląg, and Winogrady become part of city.
 1927
 Poznań Radio Station established.
 Ilustracja Poznańska begins publication.
 15th Poznań Uhlan Regiment monument unveiled.
 1928 – Czarna Trzynastka Poznań wins its first and only Polish men's basketball championship.
 1929 – Warta Poznań wins its first Polish football championship.
 1930
 Tadeusz Kościuszko monument unveiled.
 Population: 266,742.
 AZS Poznań wins its first Polish men's basketball championship.
 1933 – Golęcin and Podolany become part of city.
 1935 – Lech Poznań wins its first Polish men's basketball championship.

World War II (1939–1945)

 1939
 September: During the invasion of Poland at the beginning of World War II, near Słupca, the Germans bombed a train with Polish civilians fleeing the Wehrmacht from Poznań.
 Poznań Nightingales (choir) secretly founded.
 10 September: German troops invade Poznań, beginning of German occupation.
 10 September: Inhabitants of Poznań were among the victims of a massacre of Poles committed by German troops in Zdziechowa.
 12 September: The Einsatzkommando 1 and Einsatzgruppe VI paramilitary death squads entered the city to commit various crimes against the population.
 September: Mass arrests of Poles by the occupying forces.
 September: City made the headquarters of the central district of the Selbstschutz, which task was to commit atrocities against Poles during the German invasion of Poland.
 September: Tajna Polska Organizacja Wojskowa (Secret Polish Military Organization) Polish resistance organization founded.
 October: Infamous Fort VII concentration camp established by the Germans for imprisonment of Poles arrested in the city and region during the Intelligenzaktion.
 October:  (Poznań Military Organization),  (National Fighting Organization), Ojczyzna (Homeland) and Komitet Niesienia Pomocy (Relief Committee) Polish resistance organizations founded.
 16, 18, 20, 26, 28 October: Mass executions of 71 Polish prisoners in Fort VII. Among the victims were teachers, merchants, farmers, craftsmen, workers, doctors, lawyers, editors of Polish newspapers.
 22 October: First expulsion of Poles carried out by the German police.
 November: Transit camp for Poles expelled from the city established by the occupiers.
 8, 18, 29 November: Further executions of over 30 Polish prisoners in Fort VII. Among the victims were merchants, craftsmen, editors of Polish newspapers.
 11 November: Special Staff for the Resettlement of Poles and Jews (Sonderstab für die Aussiedlung von Polen und Juden) founded by the Germans to coordinate the expulsion of Poles from the city and region, known as the Central Bureau for Resettlement (UWZ, Umwandererzentralstelle) since 1940.
 12–16 November: German police and SS massacred 60 Polish prisoners of the Fort VII concentration camp in the forest of Dębienko near Poznań.
 December: Further executions of 14 Polish craftsmen in Fort VII.
 The Germans massacred over 630 Polish prisoners of the Fort VII concentration camp, incl. 70 students of Poznań universities and colleges and 70 nuns, in the forest of Dopiewiec near Poznań.
 Ernst Damzog, former commander of the Einsatzgruppe V, was appointed the police inspector for both Sicherheitspolizei and Sicherheitsdienst in German-occupied Poznań.
 Tadeusz Kościuszko and 15th Poznań Uhlan Regiment monuments destoyed by the Germans.

 1940
 January: Further executions of 67 Poles in Fort VII. Among the victims were teachers, local officials, engineers, artists, priests, professors and merchants.
 27 January, 20 February, 5 March, 25 April: The Germans massacred over 700 Polish prisoners of the Fort VII concentration camp, incl. 120 women, in the forest of Dębienko.
 February: The regional branch of the Union of Armed Struggle begins to organize.
 February, April and May: Further executions of 21 Poles in Fort VII.
 Early 1940: The Germans massacred over 2,000 Polish prisoners of the Fort VII concentration camp in the forest of Dopiewiec.
 Spring:  (Independent Poland) resistance organization starts operating in Poznań.
 April: First arrests of members of Wojskowa Organizacja Ziem Zachodnich carried out by the Germans.
 20 April: Over 100 Poles were arrested by the Germans in the city in just one day.
 June: Bureau of the Government Delegation for Poland for Polish territories annexed by Germany founded.
 1 August: Stalag XXI-D prisoner-of-war camp for Allied POWs established by the occupiers.
 Autumn: Regional branch of the Bataliony Chłopskie resistance organization established.
 Autumn: Wojskowa Organizacja Ziem Zachodnich crushed by the Germans. Surviving members joined the Union of Armed Struggle.
 Adam Mickiewicz monument destroyed by the Germans.
 1941
 The German labor office in Poznań demanded that children as young as 12 register for work, but it is known that even ten-year-old children were forced to work.
 Spring: Komitet Niesienia Pomocy joined the Union of Armed Struggle.
 May: The Polish resistance movement facilitated escapes of British prisoners of war from the Stalag XXI-D POW camp.
 1942: Mass arrests of members of the Komitet Niesienia Pomocy resistance organization carried out by the Germans.
 1943
 20–21 February: A flying unit of the Union of Armed Struggle and Home Army carried out a spectacular operation to burn down Wehrmacht warehouses in the local river port.
 14 September: Kidnapped Polish children from Poznań were deported to a camp for Polish children in Łódź, which was nicknamed "little Auschwitz" due to its conditions.
 October: Reichsführer-SS Heinrich Himmler delivers Posen speeches.
 Lake Rusałka created.
 1944
 April: Fort VII concentration camp dissolved.
 Aerial bombing by U.S. forces.
 1945
 January: Stalag XXI-D POW camp dissolved.
 January–February: Battle of Poznań.
 End of German occupation.

1945–1990s

 1945 – Głos Wielkopolski newspaper begins publication.
 1947 – Poznań Philharmonic founded.
 1950 – Population: 320,700.
 1952 – Lake Malta created.
 1954 – City administration divided into five dzielnicas:  Stare Miasto, Nowe Miasto, Jeżyce, Grunwald, and Wilda.
 1956
 Poznań 1956 protests.
 Poznań Cathedral rebuilt.
 Mass raising of funds, food, medical supplies and equipment, and blood donation for the Poznań-inspired Hungarian Revolution of 1956.
 29 October: First two airplanes with aid for the Hungarians depart Poznań.
 30 October: Manifestation of support for the Hungarian Revolution of 1956.
 1963
 Piątkowo transmitter erected.
 Wielkopolskie Muzeum Wojskowe (military museum) opens.
 1964 – Teatr Osmego Dnia (theatre group) founded.
 1966 – Sister city partnership signed between Poznań and Brno.
 1967 – Rebuilt Tadeusz Kościuszko monument unveiled.
 1970 – Park Cytadela established.

 1971
 Grunwald Poznań wins its first Polish handball championship.
 Polonia Poznań wins its first Polish rugby championship.
 1973 – Polish Dance Theatre founded.
 1974
 Hala Arena opens.
 Zoo established.
 Population: 502,800.
 1979 – Sister city partnership signed between Poznań and Jyväskylä, Finland.
 1980 – Municipal Stadium opens.
 1982
 Rebuilt 15th Poznań Uhlan Regiment monument unveiled.
 Poznań Army monument unveiled.
 1983
 Lech Poznań wins its first Polish football championship.
 June: Visit of Pope John Paul II.
 1987 – Kiekrz, Morasko, and Radojewo become part of city.
 1989 – Lech Poznań wins its tenth Polish men's basketball championship.
 1990
 Wojciech Szczęsny Kaczmarek becomes mayor.
 Population: 590,049.
 1991
 Gazeta Poznańska newspaper begins publication.
 6 April: Sister city partnership signed between Poznań and Toledo, Ohio, United States.

 1997
 Sekcja Rowerzystów Miejskich (bicycle advocacy group) active.
 Poznański Szybki Tramwaj (tramway) opens.
 June: Visit of Pope John Paul II.
 1998 – Ryszard Grobelny becomes mayor.
 1999
 City becomes capital of Greater Poland Voivodeship.
 Monument to victims of the Katyn massacre and Soviet deportations to Siberia unveiled.
 2000 – Polish 31st Air Base established near city.

21st century

 2007
 Bishop Jordan Bridge opens to Ostrów Tumski.
 Monument to Marian Rejewski, Jerzy Różycki and Henryk Zygalski, cryptologist who deciphered the Enigma machine, unveiled.
 Polish Underground State monument unveiled.
 2008
 23 January: Sister city partnership signed between Poznań and Győr, Hungary.
 Animator International Animated Film Festival begins.
 December: City hosts 2008 United Nations Climate Change Conference.
 2009
 6 July: Sister city partnership signed between Poznań and Kutaisi, Georgia.
 September: Poznań co-hosts the EuroBasket 2009.
 2010 – Population: 551,627.
 2011
 City administration divided into 42 osiedles (neighbourhoods).
 March: Honorary Consulate of Croatia opened.
 August: Transatlantyk – Poznań International Film and Music Festival begins.

 2012 – Poznań co-hosts the UEFA Euro 2012.
 2013
 February: Honorary Consulate of Guatemala opened.
 August: Homeless World Cup football contest held.
 2014
 January: Honorary Consulate of Luxembourg opened.
 April: Poznań Croissant Museum established.
 2015 – Ignacy Jan Paderewski monument unveiled.
 2017 – Sister city partnership signed between Poznań and Bologna, Italy.
 2021
 14 July: Honorary Consulate of Estonia opened.
 June: Bohdan Smoleń monument unveiled.
 25 September: Enigma Cipher Centre established.

See also
 History of Poznań
 List of mayors of Poznań after 1825 (burmistrzowie) 
 List of mayors of Poznań (prezydentów) 
 Category:Timelines of cities in Poland (in Polish)
 Museum of the History of Poznań

References

This article incorporates information from the Polish Wikipedia.

Bibliography

in English
Published in 18th–19th centuries
 
 
 
 
 
 

Published in 20th century

in other languages

External links

 Links to fulltext city directories for Poznan via Wikisource
 Europeana. Items related to Poznań, various dates.

 
Poznan
poznan
Years in Poland